Ambrose Parsons House is a historic home located at Springs in Suffolk County, New York. It was built in 1842 and 1851, and is a frame Greek Revival style residence. It is a two-story structure with a random ashlar, granite foundation.  It has a square plan ( by ), cedar shingle siding with corner boards, cedar wood shingle roofing, a one-story kitchen wing, and two principal elevations. The house is next door to the Charles Parsons Blacksmith Building.

It was added to the National Register of Historic Places in 1996. Though the NRHP lists the site as being at Springs-Fireplace Road at the Junction with Old Stone Highway, it is actually at the corner of Springs-Fireplace Road and Parson's Place, which is near the address given by NRHP.

References

Houses on the National Register of Historic Places in New York (state)
Houses completed in 1851
Houses in Suffolk County, New York
1851 establishments in New York (state)
National Register of Historic Places in Suffolk County, New York